Leon Bebler (born 4 December 1912, date of death unknown) was a Slovenian skier. He competed in the Nordic combined event at the 1936 Winter Olympics.

References

External links
 

1912 births
Year of death missing
Slovenian male Nordic combined skiers
Olympic Nordic combined skiers of Yugoslavia
Nordic combined skiers at the 1936 Winter Olympics
Skiers from Ljubljana